Acrocercops phaeomorpha is a moth of the family Gracillariidae, known from Maharashtra, Gujarat, and Bihar, India. It was described by Edward Meyrick in 1919. The hostplant for the species is Madhuca indica, and Madhuca latifolia.

References

phaeomorpha
Moths of Asia
Moths described in 1919